The '92 Demos is a demo collection by Local H. Originally released on cassette three years prior to their debut album, Ham Fisted, the collection was re-released by G&P Records in 1999 and is currently only available through their website.

At the time this was recorded, the band was a three-piece, with Scott Lucas on vocals and guitar, Matt Garcia on bass and Joe Daniels on drums.  Two of these songs, "User" and "Mayonnaise and Malaise", would later appear on Ham Fisted after undergoing significant changes. "Blur" was also revisited for the band's album Twelve Angry Months.

Track listing 
 "Nothing Much At All" – 2:19
 "Blur" – 3:03
 "User" – 5:19
 "No More" – 3:14
 "Bigger" – 3:52
 "Mayonnaise and Malaise" – 3:48
 "Congressman" – 4:38

Credits 
 Scott Lucas – vocals, guitar
 Matt Garcia – bass
 Joe Daniels – drums

1999 compilation albums
Demo albums
Local H compilation albums
Self-released albums